Maria Jonae Palmgren (1630, Gränna - before 28 May 1708) was a Swedish female scholar.

In 1645, she was accepted as a student at the Visingsö college of Count Brahe. Alongside her fellow student, the German Ursula Agricola from Strassburg, who was accepted one year prior (1644), she is likely to have been the first female student in Sweden: the next student of her sex was at the same school was Aurora Liljenroth in 1780.

After her studies, Palmgren married her fellow student, the official of count Brahe, Peter Wickenberg.

References 
 Maria Jonae Palmgren i Wilhelmina Stålberg, Anteckningar om svenska qvinnor 
 https://web.archive.org/web/20090720075150/http://bossebus.eu/Html/000/0035/928.htm
 Tage Grennfelt: Gränna- Visingö historia (1980)
http://subbe.se/anor/ant_an/p74382519.html
https://web.archive.org/web/20160303231115/http://hem.fyristorg.com/ingegard-lennart/anoringk/sida0/h_c3.htm

1630 births
1708 deaths
17th-century Swedish women
People of the Swedish Empire
17th-century Swedish writers